King Ngangomhlaba kaGwebi'nkumbi (Mpisekhaya Sigcawu) was the King of the AmaXhosa nation from 1923 to the 2nd of June 1933 and his Bungeni Zwelidumile Sigcawu took over the throne after his death. His father was King Salukaphathwa Gwebi'nkumbi Sigcawu.

King Mpisekhaya died on the 2 June 1933

Xhosa people
Rulers of the Gcaleka
1933 deaths
Year of birth unknown